Stepandić, anglicised Stepandic or Stepandich is a Serbian surname.

Notable people with this surname include:
 Miloš Stepandić (born 1990), Serbian football player
 Milovan Stepandić  (1954–2020), Serbian basketball coach

Serbian surnames